The 2019 UCI Para-cycling Road World Championships is the World Championships for road cycling for athletes with a physical disability. The Championships took place in Emmen in The Netherlands from 11 to 15 September 2019.

Medalists

Medal table
25 nations won medals

Participating nations
49 nations

References

External links
Results book

UCI Para-cycling Road World Championships
UCI Para-cycling Road World Championships
UCI Para-cycling Road World Championships
International cycle races hosted by the Netherlands
UCI